Al Badiʼah is a historical neighborhood and a subject of Baladiyah al-Shumaisi in south-west Riyadh, Saudi Arabia. It is bordered to al-Shumaysi and al-Jarradiyah to the east and Ulayshah neighborhood to the north and today is considered a part of the old city area which hosts several traditional markets.

References 

Neighbourhoods in Riyadh